William St Clair Grant Jnr. (8 September 1894 – 26 September 1918) was the son of a Scottish international rugby player, born in Bhaugulpore, Bengal, India.

Cricket career

Grant also played first-class cricket for Gloucestershire County Cricket Club.

Military career

He served in World War I and died of his wounds in a field hospital near Passchendaele, Belgium at the age of 24. He was a captain in the Cameroon Highlanders. He had just been awarded the Military Cross and the Croix de Guerre Belge.

Family

His father - also named William St Clair Grant - was capped twice for  against England in 1873–1874. His father also played for Craigmount RFC.

He appears to be the son of the second wife of the rugby international - Camille Grant (née Sciortino) - who William St Clair Grant had married at Bhaugulpore on 30 April 1892. The William St Clair Grant (the rugby cap) had previously married Wilhelmina Henrietta Clair Smith at Bhaugulpore on 7 January 1881 but she died there in 1884. William Sr died at Bhaugulpore 17 February 1896 aged 42 having been capped when he was only 19.

References

Notes
 Bath, Richard (ed.) The Scotland Rugby Miscellany (Vision Sports Publishing Ltd, 2007 )
 Massie, Allan A Portrait of Scottish Rugby (Polygon, Edinburgh)

External links
Cricinfo: William Grant

1894 births
1918 deaths
British military personnel killed in World War I
Scottish cricketers
Gloucestershire cricketers
British Army personnel of World War I
Queen's Own Cameron Highlanders officers
Recipients of the Military Cross
Recipients of the Croix de guerre (Belgium)